The Wigner distribution function (WDF) is used in signal processing as a transform in time-frequency analysis.

The WDF was first proposed in physics to account for quantum corrections to classical statistical mechanics in 1932 by Eugene Wigner, and it is of importance in quantum mechanics in phase space (see, by way of comparison: Wigner quasi-probability distribution, also called the Wigner function or the Wigner–Ville distribution).

Given the shared algebraic structure between position-momentum and time-frequency conjugate pairs, it also usefully serves in signal processing, as a transform in time-frequency analysis, the subject of this article. Compared to a short-time Fourier transform, such as the Gabor transform, the Wigner distribution function provides the highest possible temporal vs frequency resolution which is mathematically possible within the limitations of the uncertainty principle. The downside is the introduction of large cross terms between every pair of signal components and between positive and negative frequencies, which makes the original formulation of the function a poor fit for most analysis applications. Subsequent modifications have been proposed which preserve the sharpness of the Wigner distribution function but largely suppress cross terms.

Mathematical definition 

There are several different definitions for the Wigner distribution function. The definition given here is specific to time-frequency analysis. Given the time series , its non-stationary auto-covariance function is given by

 

The Wigner function  is then given by first expressing the autocorrelation function in terms of the average time  and time lag , and then Fourier transforming the lag.

 

So for a single (mean-zero) time series, the Wigner function is simply given by

 

The motivation for the Wigner function is that it reduces to the spectral density function at all times  for stationary processes, yet it is fully equivalent to the non-stationary autocorrelation function. Therefore, the Wigner function tells us (roughly) how the spectral density changes in time.

Time-frequency analysis example 

Here are some examples illustrating how the WDF is used in time-frequency analysis.

Constant input signal
When the input signal is constant, its time-frequency distribution is a horizontal line along the time axis. For example, if x(t) = 1, then

Sinusoidal input signal
When the input signal is a sinusoidal function, its time-frequency distribution is a horizontal line parallel to  the time axis, displaced from it by the sinusoidal signal's frequency. For example, if , then

Chirp input signal
When the input signal is a linear chirp function, the instantaneous frequency is a linear function. This means that the time frequency distribution should be a straight line. For example, if 
 ,

then its instantaneous frequency is 

and its WDF

Delta input signal
When the input signal is a delta function, since it is only non-zero at t=0 and contains infinite frequency components, its time-frequency distribution should be a vertical line across the origin. This means that the time frequency distribution of the delta function should also be a delta function. By WDF

The Wigner distribution function is best suited for time-frequency analysis when the input signal's phase is 2nd order or lower. For those signals, WDF can exactly generate the time frequency distribution of the input signal.

Boxcar function
 ,

the rectangular function     ⇒

Cross term property
The Wigner distribution function is not a linear transform. A cross term ("time beats") occurs when there is more than one component in the input signal, analogous in time to frequency beats. In the ancestral physics Wigner quasi-probability distribution, this term has important and useful physics consequences, required for faithful expectation values. By contrast, the short-time Fourier transform does not have this feature.  Negative features of the WDF are reflective of the Gabor limit of the classical signal and physically unrelated to any possible underlay of quantum structure.

The following are some examples that exhibit the cross-term feature of the Wigner distribution function.

In order to reduce the cross-term difficulty, several  approaches have been proposed in the literature, some of them leading to new transforms as the modified Wigner distribution function, the Gabor–Wigner transform, the Choi-Williams distribution function and Cohen's class distribution.

Properties of the Wigner distribution function
The Wigner distribution function has several evident properties listed in the following table.

 Projection property
 
 Energy property
 
 Recovery property
 
 Mean condition frequency and mean condition time
 
 Moment properties 
 
 Real properties 
 
 Region properties
 
 Multiplication theorem
  
 Convolution theorem
 
 Correlation theorem
 
 Time-shifting covariance 
  
 Modulation covariance 
  
 Scale covariance

Windowed Wigner Distribution Function 
  When a signal is not time limited, its Wigner Distribution Function is hard to implement. Thus, we add a new function(mask) to its integration part, so that we only have to implement part of the original function instead of integrating all the way from negative infinity to positive infinity.  Original function:    Function with mask:    is real and time-limited

Implementation 
According to definition:

We take  as example

where  is a real function

And then we compare the difference between two conditions. 

Ideal: 
When mask function , which means no mask function.

3 Conditions 

Then we consider the condition with mask function:

We can see that  have value only between –B to B, thus conducting with  can remove  cross term of the function. But if x(t) is not a Delta function nor a narrow frequency function, instead, it is a function with wide frequency or ripple. The edge of the signal may still exist between –B and B, which still cause the cross term problem.
for example:

See also 
 Time-frequency representation
 Short-time Fourier transform
 Spectrogram
 Gabor transform
 Autocorrelation
 Gabor–Wigner transform
 Modified Wigner distribution function
Optical equivalence theorem
 Polynomial Wigner–Ville distribution
 Cohen's class distribution function
 Wigner quasi-probability distribution
 Transformation between distributions in time-frequency analysis
Bilinear time–frequency distribution

References

Further reading
 
 J. Ville, 1948. "Théorie et Applications de la Notion de Signal Analytique", Câbles et Transmission, 2, 61–74 .
 T. A. C. M. Classen and W. F. G. Mecklenbrauker, 1980. "The Wigner distribution-a tool for time-frequency signal analysis; Part I," Philips J. Res., vol. 35, pp. 217–250.
L. Cohen  (1989): Proceedings of the IEEE    77 pp. 941–981,  Time-frequency distributions---a review
L. Cohen, Time-Frequency Analysis, Prentice-Hall, New York, 1995.  
 S. Qian and D. Chen, Joint Time-Frequency Analysis: Methods and Applications, Chap. 5, Prentice Hall, N.J., 1996.
 B. Boashash, "Note on the Use of the Wigner Distribution for Time Frequency Signal Analysis", IEEE Transactions on Acoustics, Speech, and Signal Processing, Vol. 36, No. 9, pp. 1518–1521, Sept. 1988. . B. Boashash, editor,Time-Frequency Signal Analysis and Processing – A Comprehensive Reference, Elsevier Science, Oxford, 2003, .
 F. Hlawatsch, G. F. Boudreaux-Bartels: "Linear and quadratic time-frequency signal representation," IEEE Signal Processing Magazine, pp. 21–67, Apr. 1992.
 R. L. Allen and D. W. Mills, Signal Analysis: Time, Frequency, Scale, and Structure, Wiley- Interscience, NJ, 2004.
 Jian-Jiun Ding, Time frequency analysis and wavelet transform class notes, the Department of Electrical Engineering, National Taiwan University (NTU), Taipei, Taiwan, 2015.
 Kakofengitis, D., & Steuernagel, O. (2017). "Wigner's quantum phase space current in weakly anharmonic weakly excited two-state systems" European Physical Journal Plus  14.07.2017

External links

Sonogram Visible Speech Under GPL Licensed Freeware for the visual extraction of the Wigner Distribution.

Signal processing
Transforms